Ana Luísa Aparecida de Souza Soares (born 28 March 2001 in São Paulo) is a Brazilian Paralympic volleyball player. She competed at the 2020 Summer Paralympics, in sitting volleyball, winning a bronze medal as a member of the Brazilian team.

When she was fourteen years old she fractured her femur bone in her right leg due to a motorcycle accident, and that resulted in reduced movement in the limb.

References

External links
 

2001 births
Living people
Brazilian women's sitting volleyball players
Paralympic volleyball players of Brazil
Paralympic bronze medalists for Brazil
Paralympic medalists in volleyball
Volleyball players at the 2020 Summer Paralympics
Medalists at the 2020 Summer Paralympics
Sportspeople from São Paulo
21st-century Brazilian women